Humberto Carlos Nelson Cruz Silva (born 8 December 1939) is a Chilean retired footballer that played in two FIFA World Cups (1962, Chile third place, and 1966) as centre back, despite his short height. He also has been a close friend of Pelé since they played against each other in the 1960s. According to Pelé, Cruz was one of his best markers and in several interviews he has mentioned the classic moment when Cruz pulled down his pants so he wouldn't elude him. His nickname is after Cheeta (pronounced Chita in Spanish), Tarzan's ape companion.

Personal life
Cruz is well known by his nickname Chita (Cheetah) which it was given when he was a youth player of club Máximo Garay from Estación Central due to his speed to mark as a defender.

His son, Humberto Cruz Floh, was with the Universidad Católica youth ranks and represented Chile at under-20 level in the 1985 South American Championship. Another son, Claudio Cruz, played for Deportes Antofagasta and Audax Italiano.

Honours
Colo-Colo
 Primera División: 1963, 1970

Chile
 FIFA World Cup: Third place 1962
 Copa América: Third place 1967
 Copa O'Higgins: 1966
 :

References

External links
 FIFA Profile
 Humberto Cruz at PartidosdeLaRoja 

1939 births
Living people
Chilean footballers
Chile international footballers
Santiago Morning footballers
Colo-Colo footballers
O'Higgins F.C. footballers
Ñublense footballers
Ferroviarios footballers
Chilean Primera División players
Primera B de Chile players
1962 FIFA World Cup players
1966 FIFA World Cup players
Association football central defenders
Chilean football managers
Magallanes managers
Santiago Morning managers
Unión Española managers
Arturo Fernández Vial managers
Ñublense managers
Deportes Antofagasta managers
Deportes Melipilla managers
Primera B de Chile managers
Chilean Primera División managers